Vellamvelly Muraleedharan (born 12 December 1958) is an Indian politician from Kerala and current Union Minister of State for External Affairs & Parliamentary Affairs of India since 30 May 2019. He was the eighth State President of Bharatiya Janata Party (BJP) in Kerala. He is also a Member of Parliament in the Rajya Sabha, the upper house of the Indian Parliament representing the state of Maharashtra. He was sworn in as a Union Minister on 30 May 2019. On 12 June 2019, Muraleedharan was appointed Government Deputy Chief Whip in the Rajya Sabha.

Early life and politics
Muraleedharan was born to Vannathanveetil Gopalan and Nampally Vellamvelly Devaki on 12 December 1958 at Eranholi, Thalassery in Kannur District. He was educated at Kodakkalam UP School and thereafter at St Joseph's Higher Secondary School, Thalassery. He is a graduate in English literature from Government Brennen College, Thalassery. He was closely associated with Akhil Bharatiya Vidyarthi Parishad (ABVP) right from his school days.

He began his political activities during the days of National Emergency that gripped India from June 1975 to March 1977. In 1978 as the Taluk President, he led ABVP in Thalassery. He became the Kannur District Secretary in 1979 and the State Joint Secretary of ABVP in 1980.

Muraleedharan shifted his activities to the RSS at Kozhikode and became a full-time worker of ABVP. He quit his job later and was elected as the State Organizing Secretary of ABVP in 1983 at the age of 25. From 1987 to 1990, he also held the additional responsibility as All India Secretary of ABVP. During his 11 years tenure (1983–1994) as the State Organising Secretary, he worked closely with K.N. Govindacharya and Dattatraya Hosabale, who were then the successive South Zone Organising Secretaries of the ABVP. The ABVP team during 1983–1994 at the state and national level had leaders including Ananth Kumar (Karnataka), Sushil Modi (Bihar), Jagat Prakash Nadda, (Himachal Pradesh), Muraleedhara Rao (Rajasthan), Harendra Kumar (Former All India General Secretary), Om Prakash Kohli (All India President), Professor Late Bal Apte, (All India President), Vinod Tawde and Chandrakant Patil (All India General Secretaries).

Muraleedharan left for Mumbai when he was appointed All India General Secretary of ABVP for the term 1994–1996.

Muraleedharan returned to Kerala in 1997 on a research project of Khadi and Village Industries Commission at Trivandrum.

Personal life
In 1998, Muraleedharan married Dr. K. S. Jayasree who is currently a Sanskrit lecturer at Sree Narayana College, Nattika. They live at Eranhipalam, Kozhikode. The couple have no children.

Leadership of BJP

Muraleedharan's formal entry into the fore of the BJP took place during the 1998 Lok Sabha elections. He was deputed to assist Venkaiah Naidu at the BJP Central Election Control Room at New Delhi.

In 1999, Muraleedharan was appointed Vice Chairman of Nehru Yuva Kendra under Department of Youth Affairs and Sports, Government of India.

In 2004, Muraleedharan was appointed the National convener of NGO cell of BJP. Thereafter in 2005, he was made the All India convener of BJP training cell.

During his tenure as the BJP Kerala Vice president (2006–2010), his major assignments were to provide ideological orientation to the party workers in Kerala as part of training cell activities and impart and oversee training to the local body members of the BJP. He contested Loksabha election from Kozhikode Parliamentary Constituency in 2009.

In January 2010 he was elected as the State President of the Kerala BJP. He was elected for his second term in the office in January 2013.

The Kerala BJP had a vote share of 10.8 percent in the 2014 Lok Sabha Election whereas it recorded 6.4 percent in 2009. The total votes BJP got in the local body elections was nearly 28 Lakhs. The 2014–2015 membership drive has expanded the party membership base from 5.75 lakhs to 20 lakhs.

In April 2018, he was elected to Rajya Sabha the upper house of Parliament. He is the 5th ever BJP MP from Kerala. Currently, he is the state in-charge of Andhra Pradesh BJP.

Positions held

1981–1983: Regional Organizing Secretary, ABVP, Kozhikode.
1983–1994: State Organizing Secretary, ABVP.
1987–1990: All India Secretary, ABVP.
1994–1996: All India General Secretary, ABVP.
1999–2002: Vice Chairman of Nehru Yuva Kendra.
2002–2004: Director General, Nehru Yuva Kendra.
Convener, Youth Employment Generation Task Force (Khadi and Village Industry Commission).
Founder president and currently a director board member of National Yuva Cooperative Society.
2004: National convener of NGO cell of BJP.
2005: Convener, All India BJP Training Cell.
2006–2010: Vice President, Kerala BJP.
2010–2015: President, Kerala BJP state fraction.
2018 April: Elected as the Member of Parliament (Rajya Sabha) from Maharashtra. He is the 4th ever BJP leader from Kerala elected to Rajyasabha (after O Rajagopal, Alphonse Kannamthanam, Suresh Gopi).
2018 August: In charge of Andhra Pradesh, BJP
Member of the standing committee of the parliament on External Affairs
Member of Consultative Committee of the Ministry of Railways
Member of the Court of Indian Maritime University, Chennai
In May 2019, Muraleedharan became Minister of State for External Affairs and Parliamentary Affairs.
On 12 June 2019, he was appointed the Govt. Deputy Chief Whip of Rajyasabha.
In 2019, he has been elected as the President of Dakshina Bharat Hindi Prachar Sabha, in Chennai.

References

External links
 Janata Party State Presidents 

1958 births
Living people
Malayali politicians
Kerala politicians
Bharatiya Janata Party politicians from Kerala
People from Kannur district
Narendra Modi ministry
Rashtriya Swayamsevak Sangh members